Dandu Town is an urban town in Changshou District, Chongqing, People's Republic of China.

Administrative division
The town is divided into 8 villages, the following areas: Nanmuyuan Village, Dandu Village, Shenggao Village, Shuanghe Village, Xingtong Village, Longzhai Village, Weiming Village, and Zengci Village (楠木院村、但渡村、升高村、双河村、兴同村、龙寨村、未名村、曾祠村).

External links

Divisions of Changshou District
Towns in Chongqing